The medial clunial nerves innervate the skin of the buttocks closest to the midline of the body.  Those nerves arise from the posterior rami of sacral spinal nerves (S1, S2, and S3).

Additional images

External links
 
  - "Superficial Anatomy of the Lower Extremity: Cutaneous Nerves of the Posterior Aspect of the Lower Extremity"

Spinal nerves
Buttocks